The 5000 and 10000 meters distances for men in the 2012–13 ISU Speed Skating World Cup were contested over six races on six occasions, out of a total of nine World Cup occasions for the season, with the first occasion taking place in Heerenveen, Netherlands, on 16–18 November 2012, and the final occasion also taking place in Heerenveen on 8–10 March 2013.

Just like the previous season, Dutch skaters dominated the 5000/10000 distance, taking 16 out of 18 available podium places over the season, including all gold and silver medals, and only letting two bronze medals slip to a non-Dutchman. The medallists were the same as the previous season, however in a different order: Jorrit Bergsma won the cup, while his countrymen Bob de Jong – the defending champion – and Sven Kramer came second and third, respectively.

Top three

Race medallists

Standings 
''Standings as of 10 March 2013 (end of the season).

References

Men 5000